M/V Kwasind is a passenger ferry built in 1912 for the Royal Canadian Yacht Club, in Toronto, Ontario, Canada.
She was built by the Polson Iron Works and cost . Her name was taken from Henry Wadsworth Longfellow's poem about Hiawatha, as the yacht club's previous ferry is Hiawatha.

Kwasind has served as a ferry for the yacht club since 1912. She was converted from a steam engine to a diesel engine in the 1940s.

On July 29, 2000, both Kwasind, and the yacht club's older ferry,  Hiawatha, were sunk by vandals. The Kwasind was refloated, and was back in working order the day of the sinking, while Hiawatha required further repair.

References

Ferries of Ontario
1912 ships
Ships built in Ontario